Sir William Gascoigne (by 1485 – 1540) of Cardington, Bedfordshire was an English Member of Parliament.

He was born the son of George Gascoigne of Cardington.

He was pricked High Sheriff of Bedfordshire and Buckinghamshire for 1506–07, 1513–14 and 1517–18 and High Sheriff of Northamptonshire for 1518–19. He was knighted in France at 1520 when attending Henry VIII at the Field of the Cloth of Gold and was also present in 1522 at the state visit of the emperor Charles V.

He served Cardinal Wolsey as treasurer of the cardinal's household from 1523 to the cardinal's downfall in 1529 and afterwards served as steward to John Neville, 3rd Baron Latimer. He represented Bedfordshire in Parliament as a knight of the shire in 1529 and 1536.

On his death in 1540 he was buried at Cardington. He had married twice. His first marriage was with Elizabeth, the daughter and heiress of John Winter of Cardington, by whom he inherited his Cardington estate and with whom he had his only son and heir, Sir John Gascoigne. His second marriage was with Elizabeth, the daughter of Sir John Pennington of Muncaster, Cumberland, and the widow of Sir Walter Strickland and Sir Richard Cholmley. He was succeeded by Sir John.

References

External links
 findagrave.com memorial record

1480s births
1540 deaths
People from Bedfordshire
Knights Bachelor
English MPs 1529–1536
High Sheriffs of Bedfordshire
High Sheriffs of Buckinghamshire
High Sheriffs of Northamptonshire
English MPs 1536